Rezaul Karim Chowdhury  (born 31 May 1953) is a Bangladeshi politician and incumbent mayor of Chittagong City Corporation. He is also the joint general secretary of Chattogram Mahanagar Awami League. He was elected in 2021.

Early life and education
Chowdhury was born on 31 May 1953 in East Sholashahar ward 7 in Chittagong. He studied at East Sholashahar Primary School. He completed his S. S. C. from Government Muslim High School and H. S. C. from Chittagong College. He has a B.A. from the University of Chittagong.

Career 
Chowdhury was the president of Bangladesh Chhatra League unit from 1972 to 1976. From 1976 to 1978, he was the General Secretary of North Chittagong District unit of Bangladesh Chhatra League.

Chowdhury worked in the Chittagong City unit of Awami League from 1997 to 2006 as the information and research secretary. He then became the organising secretary of the city unit; a position he held till 2014 when he became the joint general secretary. 

Chowdhury was nominated by Awami League to contest the Chittagong City elections in 2020. The party did not nominate the incumbent and Awami League politician AJM Nasir Uddin on instructions from Prime Minister Sheikh Hasina. Chittagong city Awami League was divided into two fractions; led by A J M Nasir Uddin and the family of ABM Mohiuddin Chowdhury. Chowdhury got the nomination by not being involved in either fraction. He went on to win the election receiving 369,000 votes while his nearest rival from Bangladesh Nationalist Party received 52,000 votes. He get the status of state minister on 7 August, 2022.

Personal life
Chowdhury is married to Selina Akter and has a son and two daughters.

References

1953 births
Living people
People from Chittagong
Chittagong College alumni
University of Chittagong alumni
21st-century Bangladeshi politicians